Edward Alfred Martin Sr. (June 18, 1925 – February 25, 2002) was an American college basketball coach and Negro league baseball player.

Early years and baseball career
A native of Allentown, Pennsylvania, Martin graduated from William Allen High School, and served in the US Navy during World War II. Following his service, he attended North Carolina A&T State University, where he starred in baseball and basketball, graduating in 1951. Martin later earned a Master's Degree from Temple University. He went on to play for the Philadelphia Stars in 1951 and 1952.

Coaching career
Following his baseball playing career, Martin took a high school basketball coaching position at Avery Normal Institute in Charleston, South Carolina, where he proceeded to win two state championships. From 1955 to 1968, he coached basketball at South Carolina State University, and from 1968 to 1986, he coached at Tennessee State University, amassing over 500 wins and numerous postseason appearances in over thirty years at the collegiate level.

Later years
In his later years, Martin was assistant basketball coach at Vanderbilt University, and associate professor of human and organizational development at Vanderbilt's Peabody College. He also served as scout for the Minnesota Timberwolves. Martin was inducted into the Tennessee Sports Hall of Fame in 1994, and has also been honored by the athletic halls of fame at North Carolina A&T State University, South Carolina State University, Tennessee State University, and Vanderbilt University. He died in Nashville, Tennessee in 2002 at age 76.

References

External links
 Edward Martin at Negro Leagues Baseball Museum
 Edward Martin at Sports-Reference

1925 births
2002 deaths
African-American basketball coaches
College men's basketball head coaches in the United States
High school basketball coaches in South Carolina
Minnesota Timberwolves scouts
North Carolina A&T Aggies baseball players
North Carolina A&T Aggies men's basketball players
Philadelphia Stars players
South Carolina State Bulldogs basketball coaches
Tennessee State Tigers basketball coaches
Vanderbilt Commodores men's basketball coaches
Vanderbilt University faculty
United States Navy personnel of World War II
African Americans in World War II
African-American United States Navy personnel